Frantiček Klossner (born 28 February 1960) is a Swiss artist based in Bern, known for creating video art, installations, performance, drawings and visual poetry.

Biography 
Frantiček Klossner trained as an artist at the F+F School for Art and Media Design Zurich (1985–1989), among whose teachers were the artists Hansjörg Mattmüller, Hermann Bohmert, Norbert Klassen, Vollrad Kutscher, Valie Export, Peter Weibel, and the philosopher Gerhard J. Lischka, and among whose guest lecturers were Jean Baudrillard, Paul Virilio, and Vilém Flusser. On graduating, he won a City of Bern art scholarship, thanks to which he was able to move into a studio in the East Village in New York City and there focus on video art, performance, and installations. He won a scholarship to the Swiss Institute in Rome in 1995 and after two years at that institution decided to settle in Rome, where he remained active as an artist until 2000. On returning to Switzerland, he headed the exhibition project Identité mobile at the Murten arteplage of the Swiss National Exhibition, Expo.02.

Works 
Works and groups of works by Frantiček Klossner now feature in numerous collections, among them those of the Swiss National Museum, Kunsthaus Zurich, Museum of Fine Arts Bern, Kunstmuseum Solothurn, Kunstsammlung des Kantons Bern, Kunstsammlung der Stadt Zofingen, Graphische Sammlung der Schweizerischen Nationalbibliothek, Kunstsammlung der Schweizerischen Eidgenossenschaft, Collection Banque Bonhôte Neuchâtel, Collection Ketterer-Ertle, Neuer Berliner Kunstverein, Collection Ursula Blickle, Österreichische Galerie Belvedere Vienna, Museo de Arte Moderno de Buenos Aires MAMBA Argentina, Zentrum für Kunst und Medien Karlsruhe ZKM, Collection Reinking Hamburg

Bibliography 
 Peter Fischer: Swiss Sculpture since 1945, Snoeck Book, Exhibition catalogue, Aargauer Kunsthaus, 2021, text by Katharina Ammann, Marianne Burki, Christoph Doswald, Peter Fischer, Franz Müller, Anouchka Panchard, Peter J. Schneemann, Simone Soldini, Walter Tschopp, .
 Peter Friese: Thoughts on the Performative Installations by Franticek Klossner, in: Caerus and Chronos, Kunstverein Ruhr, Essen, NRW, Germany, 2015, .
 Christine Breyhan: Infinite Performance, Artist Talk with Franticek Klossner, in: Kunstforum International, Band 228, Köln, Germany, 2014.
 Kathleen Bühler: His- and Herstory, in: The Weak Sex – How art pictures the new male, Museum of Fine Arts Bern, Switzerland, 2013, .
 Franticek Klossner and Hans Christoph von Tavel: Curiosity successfully landed, in: Meret's Funken, Meret Oppenheim - Surrealism in contemporary art, Museum of Fine Arts Bern, Switzerland, Kerber Verlag, Bielefeld, Germany, 2012, .
 Susanne Petersen: The Sleep of Reason, in: The Mirror of Narcissus - From Mythological Demigod to Mass Phenomenon, Exhibition catalogue, Taxispalais – Kunsthalle Tirol, Innsbruck, Austria, 2012, Edited by Beate Ermacora, Maren Welsch, Texts (German/English) by Julia Brennacher, Lotte Dinse, Beate Ermacora, Christian Hartard, Silvia Höller, Markus Neuwirth, Susanne Petersen, Dieter Ronte, Jürgen Tabor, Peter Weiermair, Maren Welsch, Sylvia Zwettler-Otte, Snoeck Verlagsgesellschaft Köln, Germany, .
 Christoph Vögele: Compression and Illumination in the Work of Franticek Klossner, Museum of Fine Arts Solothurn, Switzerland, Verlag für moderne Kunst Nürnberg, Germany, 2008, .
 Michaela Nolte: Franticek Klossner - What’s left when the head is melting, Gallery Mönch Contemporary Art, Berlin, Germany, 2006.
 Gerhard J. Lischka: Video Art Austria Germany Switzerland, ZKM Center for Art and Media Karlsruhe, Germany, 2006, .
 Peter Weibel: M_ARS, Art and War, Neue Galerie Graz, Universalmuseum Joanneum, Austria, Hatje Cantz Verlag, Berlin, Germany, 2003, .
 Dolores Denaro: Franticek Klossner – Mess Up Your Mind, Exhibition catalogue, Kunsthaus Grenchen, 2001, Texts (German/English) by Bernhard Bischoff, Therese Bhattacharya Stettler, Léonard Cuénoud, Dolores Denaro, Sandra Gianfreda, Norberto Gramaccini, Manfred Hochmeister, Regula J. Kopp, Gerhard Johann Lischka, Gwendolyn Masin, Gian Paolo Minelli, Victorine Müller, Claudia Rosiny, Toni Stooss, David Streiff, Christine Szakacs, Marc Traber, Annelise Zwez, .

Exhibitions

Solo exhibitions (selection) 
 2018: Eudemonia and Ataraxia, Gallery Da Mihi, Bern, Switzerland
 2015: Kunstverein Ruhr, Essen, North Rhine-Westphalia, NRW, Germany
 2014: Centre for Contemporary Art, Wil/St. Gallen, Switzerland
 2013: Center for the Arts, Interlaken, Switzerland
 2012: Edition Multiple, Berne, Switzerland
 2008: Museum of Fine Arts Solothurn, Switzerland
 2007: Centro de Expresiones Contemporaneas, Rosario, Argentina
 2006: Gallery Mönch Contemporary Art, Berlin, Germany
 2005: Centro de Arte, Santiago de Cuba
 2004: Buenos Aires Museum of Modern Art, Argentina
 2003: Museum of Cultural History, Görlitz, Germany
 2002: Centre for Contemporary Art, Bellinzona, Switzerland
 2001: Centre for Contemporary Art, Grenchen, Switzerland

Collective exhibitions (selection) 
 2018: Art and sustainability, Mobiliar Art Center, Bern, Switzerland
 2018: Mosaic, Gallery Mayhaus, Erlach, Switzerland
 2018: Fields of Disappearance, Foundation BINZ, Zurich, Switzerland
 2017: Writing Pictures, Biennial Plakartive 17, Bielefeld, Germany
 2017: Erotika, Gallery Mayhaus, Erlach, Switzerland
 2017: Self-Perception in the Digital Age, Centre for Contemporary Art, Zofingen, Switzerland
 2017: In Visible Limits, Centre for Contemporary Art, Rapperswil-Jona, Switzerland
 2016: Lumière d’hiver, Foundation Von Rütte, Biel, Switzerland
 2016: In Visible Limits, Centre for the Arts, Interlaken, Switzerland
 2016: In Visible Limits, Centre for Contemporary Art, Aschaffenburg, Germany
 2016: Vis-À-Vis, Contemporary Arts Center Bourbaki, Lucerne, Switzerland
 2016: Danse Macabre, Museum of Communication, Berne, Switzerland
 2016: In Visible Limits, Centre for Contemporary Art, Constance, Allemagne
 2015: Hold the Line, Gallery Mönch Contemporary Art, Berlin, Germany
 2015: L'immagine di sé, Villa Croce, Museum of Contemporary Art, Genoa, Italy
 2015: Fragile, Contemporary Art Gallery C, Neuchâtel, Switzerland
 2014: Existential Visual Worlds, Museum of Modern Art Weserburg, Bremen, Germany
 2014: Artists’ Books, Prints and Drawings Department, Swiss National Library
 2014: Performative Video Art, Galerija G12HUB, Belgrade, Serbia
 2014: Des hommes et la forêt, Museum Château de Nyon, Switzerland
 2013: Art Pictures the New Male, Museum of Fine Arts Bern, Switzerland
 2013: The Way We Where, Gallery Zilberman, Istanbul, Turkey
 2013: Feu Sacré, Museum of Fine Arts Bern, Switzerland
 2012: The Mirror of Narcissus, Contemporary Arts Center Taxispalais, Innsbruck, Austria
 2012: The pictured self, Cercle Artistic de Sant Lluc, Barcelone, Spain
 2012: Swiss Video Art, Espacio Trapézio, Madrid, Spain
 2011: Bodies, Collection Reinking, Kunsthalle Osnabrück, Germany
 2010: Afterpiece, Performance Art on Video, Gallery Claudia Groeflin, Zurich, Switzerland
 2007: Collection Ketterer-Ertle, Museum of Fine Arts Appenzell, Switzerland
 2006: Villa Jelmini, Memorial Exhibition for Harald Szeemann, Kunsthalle Bern, Switzerland
 2005: The Bust since Auguste Rodin, Städtische Museen Heilbronn, Germany
 2004: Just as Things Are, Hartware Medienkunstverien, Dortmund, Germany
 2003: Art and War, M_ARS, Neue Galerie Graz, Joanneum, Austria
 2002: Change of Scene, Museum of Fine Arts Solothurn, Switzerland
 2001: Innovation and Tradition, The Swiss Mobiliar Art Collection, Berne, Switzerland
 2000: Styria Expo, Graz, Austria
 2000: Ice Age, Museum of Fine Arts Bern, Switzerland
 1999: Art Award Böttcherstrasse, Kunsthalle Bremen, Germany
 1999: Solothurn Film Festival, Switzerland
 1999: Biennale Internationale du film sur l’art, Centre Georges-Pompidou, Paris, France
 1998: Voi siete qui, Villa Maraini, Swiss Institute in Rome, Italy
 1997: Los Angeles Gay and Lesbian Film Festival, California, USA
 1997: The 19th Tokyo Video Festival, Tokyo, Japan
 1996: Video Art in Europe, Statens Museum for Kunst, Copenhagen, Denmark
 1994: Swiss Video Art, Kunsthaus Langenthal, Switzerland
 1993: Aeschlimann Corti Award, Arts Centre Pasquart, Biel, Switzerland
 1990: Young European Artists, Hannover Messe, Germany

References

External links 
 Literature in the catalogue of the Swiss National Library
 Literature in the catalogue of the German National Library
 Lexicon on Art in Switzerland, SIKART, The Swiss Institute for Art Research
 Kunstforum International, Volume 228, Christine Breyhan, Artist talk with Franticek Klossner, 2014
 Art magazine ARTMAPP, Dr. Sebastian Baden, Artist talk with Franticek Klossner, 2014
 SRF Swiss Radio and Television, Alice Henkes,  A laboratory for bizarre visual worlds, 2014
 Web page of the artist Frantiček Klossner in English
 Web page Frantiček Klossner in Arabic language

Swiss contemporary artists
Swiss video artists
Body art
Swiss installation artists
Interactive art
Swiss performance artists
1960 births
Living people